Reunion Pacific Entertainment Inc. is a Vancouver-based studio formed in 2004, producing movies and television series such as the limited series Tin Man (which was nominated for nine Primetime Emmy Awards in 2008 including the Outstanding Mini-series category and multiple categories related to films special effects, costuming, editing, and sound editing). As well as the television series Continuum which aired its fourth and final season in 2015 on Showcase in Canada, and SyFy in the US and UK, Amazon Prime's The Man in the High Castle (2015-2019) and Greg Daniels' newest comedy Upload (2020 - Present). Most recently RPE produced the new Lord of the Rings television series; The Rings of Power (2022 - Present) for Amazon Prime Video.

Filmography

Television

Films

References 

Television production companies of Canada
Companies based in Vancouver